Oliver Petrucciani (born September 6, 1969 in Losone) was a Grand Prix motorcycle road racer from Switzerland. His best year was in 1993 when he finished in seventh place in the 125cc world championship.

References 

1969 births
Swiss motorcycle racers
125cc World Championship riders
250cc World Championship riders
Living people
Sportspeople from Ticino